Demetrios Bernardakis (Dimitrios Vernardakis, also transliterated Dimitrios Bernardakis), (3 December 1833—25 January 1907) was a polymath writer and Professor of History at the National and Kapodistrian University of Athens.

Biographical sketch 
He was born at Agia Marina, Lesbos (just south of Mytilene). His father was Nikolaos Vernardakis, originally from Crete, while his mother was Melissini, of the Trantalis family. His brothers were the learned Athanasios Bernardakis and Gregorios Bernardakis.

He studied on a scholarship given to him by Patriarch Alexandros Kallinikos from present-day Skotina, Pieria. A prolific writer, he translated and annotated the tragedies of Euripides (The Phoenician Women, Hecuba, Hippolytus, and Medea), but he became known chiefly for the sake  of his own verse dramas, with which he wanted to create a romantic Greek theatre, taking as his example Shakespeare, Greek mythology, and Greek history.   His works had  success in his own era, but were quickly forgotten, chiefly by reason of their archaizing language.

His university career ended on 27 August 1869 when Bernardakis was compelled to resign by reason of continuing student reactions (the so-called Vernardakeia), which he attributed to collusion with his university rivals and their political power at the time.

His brother, Athansios Bernardakis, nominated  Demetrios twice — in 1904 and 1905 — for the Nobel Prize in Literature.

Selected works

Theatrical 
 Μαρία Δοξαπατρή (Maria Doxapatri 1857)
 Κυψελίδαι (The Beehive, 1858)
 Μερόπη (Merope, 1865)
 Ευφροσύνη (Euphrosyne, 1876)
 Φαύστα (Fausta, 1893)
 Αντιόπη (Antiope, 1895)
 Νικηφόρος Φωκάς (Nicephorus Phocas, 1905)

Linguistic 
 Ελληνική Γραμματική εις χρήσιν των Ελληνικών σχολείων (Greek Grammar for use in Greek schools, 1864–1865)
 Ψευδαττικισμού έλεγχος (The control of illusion, 1884)

Historical 
 Γενική Ιστορία (General History, 1867)

Theological 
 Ιερά Κατήχησις (Sacred Catechisis, endorsed in 1872 by the Ecumenical Patriarchate of Constantinople as the best available biblical catechesis recommended for schooldchildren)

References

External links 
 Vernardakis Dimitrios – Pandektis profile from the Institute for Neohellenic Research
 Η αποκατάσταση του Αριστοτέλη του Κώστα Γεωργουσόπουλου (mention in "The Restoration of Aristotle" by Kostas Yorgopoulos, Ta Nea, 20/10/07, preview only, subscription required)
 List of quotes listed in the Lexicon of Quotes and Aphorisms under Dimitrios Vernardakis (in Greek)

1833 births
1907 deaths
Academic staff of the National and Kapodistrian University of Athens
People from Mytilene
19th-century Greek educators
19th-century Greek writers
Greek dramatists and playwrights
19th-century Greek dramatists and playwrights